That Justice Be Done was a one-reel American propaganda film directed by George Stevens and made in 1945 by the Office of War Information for the US Chief of Counsel at Nuremberg and the War Crimes Office of the Judge Advocate General's Corps.

The film opens with a shot of the Jefferson Memorial and a voice over of Thomas Jefferson declaring his opposition to all forms of tyranny, then slowly fades to footage of Adolf Hitler making a speech soon dubbed into English "We have the right to do anything which benefits the German race, including complete expulsion of inferior peoples." The camera then moves to the crowds of people shouting "Sieg heil" and the soundtrack continues over pictures of war crimes.

The narrator describes how the various classes of war criminals, traitors, and people who committed specific acts are dealt with, then moves on to the major Nazi war criminals. The narrator states that we cannot torture or poison them like they did to their victims, but must uphold a higher standard of justice, exemplified by George Washington. The film states that 1945 must be the year of not only Germany's military defeat but also that of a trial and therefore a public exposure and repudiation of the ideas of Nazism itself.

See also 
List of Allied propaganda films of World War II
The Nuremberg Trials - a 1947 Soviet propaganda film about the Nuremberg Trials

External links 
 

Full film at the US Holocaust Museum

Nuremberg trials
World War II war crimes trials films
American World War II propaganda shorts
United States government films
Films directed by George Stevens
1945 films
American black-and-white films
American war films
1945 documentary films
American documentary films
1940s war films
1940s American films